Lasbela (Urdu:  لسبيلہ  ) neighborhood is located in Jamsheed Town, Karachi, Sindh, Pakistan. The Lasbela bridge is over Lyari River and one of the most important bridges in Karachi. This is the only bridge in Karachi to which the 2nd entrance of the mosque is connected and the name of this mosque is Jamia Masjid Quba and also the Green Line buses runs on it in a separate lane.
sabri Hotel, Chishti Bakery, Aone Cloth House, Naseem Cloth Market

Nawab of Lasbella from Lasbela District in Balochistan, had his official residence or consulate near the Lyari River before independence of Pakistan. The area got associated with Nawab of Lasbela and was known as Lasbela. The newly built bridge in the area over the Lyari River came to be known as Lasbela bridge.

There are several ethnic groups in Lasbela including Muhajirs, Sindhis, Punjabis, Kashmiris, Saraikis, Pakhtuns, Balochis, Memons, Bohras,  Ismailis, etc. Over 99% of the population is Muslim.

See also 
 Lasbela bridge
 Liaquatabad Town
 Lasbela District
 Qureshi Co-operative Housing Society, near Gulbahar Police Station

References

Neighbourhoods of Karachi